Quanzhou railway station is located in Fengze District, Quanzhou, Fujian Province, People's Republic of China, on the Fuzhou–Xiamen railway which is operated by China Railway Nanchang Group, China Railway Corporation. It opened on April 26, 2010.

Nearby bus station
Quanzhou North bus station is located beside the railway station. Construction began in 2017 and it opened in 2019.

Other railway stations in Quanzhou
The older Quanzhou East railway station, served by conventional (not high-speed) trains, closed on December 9, 2014,
a few years after the opening of the new Quanzhou Railway Station.

References

Railway stations in Fujian
Railway stations in China opened in 2010